Furia may refer to:

Furia gens, an ancient Roman family
Furia (album), of 1999 by Brian May
Furia (film), a 1999 French romantic drama film
Furia (band), a Polish black metal band
Fury (1947 film), an Italian film with the original title Furia
The Rage (2002 film), a Romanian film with the original title Furia
Erinyes (mythology), female chthonic deities of vengeance in ancient Greek religion and mythology also known as the Furies
Furia (novel), a 2020 YA Contemporary novel 
Furia Esports, a Brazilian esports organization 
A1-CM Furia, a Ukrainian unmanned aerial vehicle
Furia (genus of fungus), in the Entomophthoraceae family

See also
 Fury